Yunusovo (Yonos) is a rural locality (a village) in Alkinsky Selsoviet, Salavatsky District, Bashkortostan, Russia. The population was 248 as of 2010. There are 5 streets.

Geography 
Yunusovo is located 18 km southwest of Maloyaz (the district's administrative centre) by road. Idrisovo is the nearest rural locality.

References 

Rural localities in Salavatsky District